Secret Life of Toys is a 1994 children's TV series based on the 1986 Christmas TV special The Christmas Toy. Each of the fourteen 30-minute episodes consists of two 15-minute stories. The show was taped in Monheim, Germany (near the Dutch border), and aired on The Disney Channel in the US (beginning on 5 March 1994), the BBC in the United Kingdom, Family Channel, Vrak and TVO in Canada, Spacetoon in the Arab world, Top TV in South Africa, The Kids' Channel in Israel, RTB in Brunei, Armed Forces Network in Germany and Japan, TVP1 in Poland, Channel 55 in Bahrain and on ABC TV in Australia. The series was formerly streamed on Netflix and Hulu and is currently available on Kidoodle. TV

Plot
This series depicts the further adventures of Rugby Tiger and his friends in a new playroom with two different children, Penny and Simon. Penny and Simon's playtime affect how the toys' setting and situations are in the children's absence. For the toys' safety, they have a code called a set of No-nos. However one of the toys end up breaking one of those rules by accident. When that happens, they toys have to work together to keep the fact they can move and speak away from the humans.

Characters

Main characters
 Rugby Tiger (Dave Goelz) is a plucky tiger plush toy who is always looking for an adventure. He was designed by Larry DiFiori and built by Rollie Krewson.
 Mew (Nigel Plaskitt) is Rugby's good friend who is a catnip mouse toy that belongs to the family cat. He was designed by Larry DiFiori and built by Joann Green.
 Balthazar (Jerry Nelson) is a really old bear plush toy who is very wise. He functions as a fatherlike leader to the toys, and tells them when it's safe for them to move. He was designed by Larry DiFiori] and built by Joann Green
 Raisin (Louise Gold) is a tomboyish rag doll replacing Apple.
 Hortense (Louise Gold) is a worry-prone rocking horse replacing Belmont.
 Ditz (Dave Goelz) is a clown plush toy who can easily get mixed up. He was designed by Larry DiFiori and built by Marian Keating.

Other characters
 Bratty Rat (Jerry Nelson) is a shifty rat who was purchased at a secondhand store.
 Bunny Lamp (Mike Quinn) takes care of the lighting in the toy room and warns the toys when people are coming.
 Bleep (Rob Mills) is a toy robot who sometimes freezes during his speech. He was designed by Larry DiFiori and built by Tom Newby and Norman Tempia.
 Cruiser (Brian Henson) looks like a Fisher Price Little People figure who drives a taxi. He loves to use cool slang words. His motto is: "A dollar on the drop, and ten cents for any additional miles." He was designed by Larry DiFiori and built by Tom Newby and Norman Tempia.
 Datz (Jerry Nelson) is a paper bag puppet that looks like his brother Ditz.
 Dinkybeard (Jerry Nelson) is a wooden toy pirate. He was designed and built by Paul Andrejco.
 Daffodil (Louise Gold) is a breakable princess doll who lives on the top shelf. Nobody really understands her. Daffodil is arguably the oldest toy in the house, having belonged to a family that previously owned it. After her original owner grew up and moved away, she lived alone in the attic of the house for many childhoods until the current family's children found her and brought her into their playroom. She alone among the toys understands what the attic actually is.
 Eggie (Mike Quinn) is a dimwitted Humpty Dumpty-like toy egg who thinks eggs are the smartest creatures in the world.
 Humble Gary (Mike Quinn) is an extremely humble tiger.

Episodes

References

External links
 

1994 American television series debuts
1994 American television series endings
1990s American children's television series
1994 British television series debuts
1994 British television series endings
1990s British children's television series
American television shows featuring puppetry
British television shows featuring puppetry
BBC children's television shows
Disney Channel original programming
Australian Broadcasting Corporation original programming
Television series by The Jim Henson Company
Sentient toys in fiction